Argyrops bleekeri is also known as Taiwan tai. It is a species of fish in the family Sparidae.
It is found from Japan to Australia in the Western Pacific.

Etymology
The fish is named in honor of Dutch medical doctor and ichthyologist Pieter Bleeker (1819–1878), who reported this species as Sparus which is now Argyrops spinifer in 1865.

References

Iwatsuki, Y. and P.C. Heemstra, 2018. Taxonomic review of the genus Argyrops (Perciformes; Sparidae) with three new species from the Indo-West Pacific. Zootaxa 4438(3):401-442.

Sparidae
Taxa named by Masamitsu Ōshima
Fish described in 1927
Fish of the Pacific Ocean